Alaus is a genus of click beetle belonging to the family Elateridae. Unlike many click beetles, Alaus larvae are completely predatory.

Selected species 
 Alaus lusciosus (Hope, 1832)
 Alaus melanops LeConte, 1863
 Alaus myops (Fabricius, 1791)
 Alaus naja Candèze, 1868
 Alaus oculatus (Linnaeus, 1758) - eyed click beetle
 Alaus oklahomensis Hatch, 1930
 Alaus pantherinus Candèze, 1881 
 Alaus patricius Candeze, 1857
 Alaus plebejus Candèze, 1874
 Alaus zunianus Casey, 1893

References 

 Biolib
  Zipcodezoo Species Identifier
 Names

Elateridae genera